Berlesia is a genus of mites in the family Laelapidae.

Species
 Berlesia rapax G.Canestrini, 1884

References

Laelapidae
Acari genera